The 5th Pan Arab Games were held in Damascus, Syria between October 6 and October 21, 1976. 2,174 athletes from 11 countries participated in events in 18 sports.

Sports 
  Athletics
  Basketball 
  Boxing
  Road bicycle racing
  Equestrian
  Football 
  Artistic gymnastics
  Weightlifting
  Handball
  Judo
  Karate
  Wrestling
  Swimming
  Tennis
  Table tennis
  Archery
  Volleyball
  Water polo

Medal table

 
Pan Arab Games
Pan Arab Games
Pan Arab Games
Pan Arab Games
Pan Arab Games, 1976
Multi-sport events in Syria
20th century in Damascus
October 1976 sports events in Asia